Jules François Émile Krantz (29 December 1821 in Givet – 25 February 1914 near Toulon) was a French naval officer and politician. In Vietnamese royal records, he was referred as Ca Răng (哥𪘵).

Life
He left the École navale in 1837, initially serving off the west African coast and then in the Mediterranean and Brazil. He was professor of navigation on board the Borda (1852). He commanded the Ténare during the Crimean War, taking part in the attacks on Sebastopol and the Kinbourn peninsula. He was then sent to Vietnam (1858–59) and the China Sea and Japan (1862–64, where he took part in the bombardment of Pei-Ho). He was then commander of the gunnery-school ship Louis XIV at Cherbourg (1869).

He commanded the naval division on the China Sea in 1873 and became military governor of Cochinchine from 16 March to 30 November 1874. He took part in the Franco-Prussian War, commanding the marines at fort d'Ivry. In 1877 he was promoted to vice admiral, followed by becoming maritime prefect of Toulon in October 1879. He later became chief of staff becoming Minister for the Navy and the Colonies from 5 January 1888 to 22 February 1889, then naval minister from 19 March 1889 to 17 March 1890.

Sources

Étienne Taillemite, Dictionnaire des marins français, éditions Tallandier, 2002, 573 p.

1821 births
1914 deaths
People from Givet
French Navy admirals
French Naval Ministers
Governors of Cochinchina
French military personnel of the Crimean War
Grand Croix of the Légion d'honneur
Grand Crosses of the Order of Saint-Charles